NRF may refer to:

 National Redemption Front, rebel alliance in Darfur
 National Research Foundation (South Africa)
 National Resistance Front of Afghanistan, an anti-Taliban militia formerly based in Bazarak, Afghanistan
 National Response Framework
 National Retail Federation
 National Revolutionary Faction, a former UK political group
 NATO Response Force
 Naval Reactors Facility, Idaho National Laboratory, US
 Neighbourhood Renewal Fund
 Norwegian Red, a breed of cattle
 Nouvelle Revue Française, a literary magazine
 nrf, the ISO 639-3 code for Jèrriais and Guernésiais languages

See also
 NRF1, Nuclear Respiratory Factor